The Pushkar Singh Dhami ministry is the current Cabinet of Uttarakhand headed by the Chief Minister of Uttarakhand, Pushkar Singh Dhami.

Council of Ministers

References

Dhami II
Dhami II
Pushkar II
Cabinets established in 2022
2022 establishments in Uttarakhand